Diplogelasinospora is a genus of fungi within the Lasiosphaeriaceae family.

References

External links
Diplogelasinospora at Index Fungorum

Lasiosphaeriaceae